(also IMAGEFIGHT) is a 1988 vertically scrolling shooter arcade game developed and published by Irem. It was ported to the Nintendo Entertainment System, PC Engine (Japan-only), Sharp X68000 (Japan-only), and FM Towns (Japan-only) in 1990.

Plot
The following is taken directly from the NES instruction manual:

On a fateful day in 20XX, the Earth's moon exploded into four large fragments and a multitude of meteors. Aliens from afar had succeeded in destroying the West's moon base. One after another, mankind's other military industrial space complexes were being lost. What mankind dreaded had come to pass. Scores of unidentified fighters were in the area. In addition, the moon's main computer, still intact after the explosion, had a strange vegetation coiled around it. Their trademark evil exploits being a dead giveaway, invaders from the Boondoggle Galaxy had arrived to take over the Earth. To counter these evil forces, leading scientists from all over the globe created the "OF-1" Fightership. Combat pilots depart the Earth to fend off the invaders and earn everlasting glory.

Game play
Image Fight was released one year after Irem's successful horizontal scroller, R-Type, and, although not directly related, the two games have some similarities.

The player flies a futuristic red ship. R-Type Final identifies this ship as the OF-1 Daedalus, but it is not known if that was the ship's original name. However, the term OF-1 does appear in the NES version's instruction manual, as well as in the official artwork for the sequel, Image Fight II. The game appears to be set inside a holographic simulator, like the holodeck on Star Trek: The Next Generation. 

The game begins with five stages taking place inside a combat simulation, and the player's ability to destroy enemy entities is tested. Upon finishing a simulation stage, the game displays results and shows if their score is considered passing or failing. The player must have an average kill rate of 90% or better in the simulation stages to immediately proceed to real combat. If the player fails, they must play an additional stage before entering real combat. Real combat consists of three stages. The real combat stages play very much like a traditional shoot em' up game, where the player immediately proceeds to the next stage upon completing the current stage.

Pods
The defining feature of Image Fight is the Pod - a small, coloured sphere with two short gun barrels attached to it. The Pod, once collected, floats alongside the player's ship.

There are two different kinds of Pod:

 Red Pod - this changes direction based on the movement of the ship, and can therefore be aimed at enemies. This can be very useful, as enemies can and do attack from any direction.
 Blue Pod - similar to the Red Pod, except it always points forward and the direction cannot be changed. This makes it more powerful in direct confrontations, but less versatile.

The ship can support up to three Pods. The first two Pods collected will take up positions on the left and right sides of the ship; the third Pod hovers behind it.

Pod Shot
The Pod Shot is a special attack in which the side Pods are launched forward at high speed, before circling back and returning to the ship. This enables them to be used as projectiles themselves, and thrown at enemies ahead. This attack can be performed with either one or two side Pods - the rear Pod, if present, does not participate.

Speed control
The ship has four different levels of speed that the player can switch between, to allow for more precise manoeuvering in confined spaces. The structure of the ship transforms during a speed change, the wings angling down and back at higher speeds.

The ship's thrusters exhaust a large blue flame whenever the ship changes speed; this can be used as a weapon to damage or destroy enemies.

'Forces'
The player can acquire various butterfly-shaped devices that attach to the front of the ship. These are very similar in function to the Force in R-Type - they turn the player's blaster into a powerful laser weapon. They can also act as a weak shield, protecting the ship from impact; this destroys them but leaves the ship intact. Unlike the Force in R-Type, they cannot be ejected from the ship - the only way to remove them, in fact, is to have them destroyed. The ship cannot pick up a new device if one is already attached. There are a number of different kinds, each of which provides a different weapon. The weapon names are taken from R-Type Final. R-Type Final implies that these devices are in fact early versions of what it calls the OF Force, but this may be retroactive continuity.

Ports and related releases
 
The arcade game was also ported for the Nintendo Entertainment System as well as becoming a Japan-only game for the PC Engine, Sharp X68000, and FM Towns in 1990. The PC Engine version was later re-released for the Wii Virtual Console only in Japan. In 1998, Image Fight, along with another arcade game by Irem, X-Multiply, was released only in Japan as a one-disc double-bill for the Sony PlayStation and the Sega Saturn.

The arcade game was followed by Image Fight II: Operation Deepstriker, a sequel for the PC Engine Super CD-ROM² in 1992 exclusively in Japan. Like the PC Engine version of the first game, Image Fight II was re-released for the Wii U Virtual Console in Japan in 2015 and for the first time in the United States on February 8, 2018 for both games. Image Fight II and its PC Engine prequel also made their European debut on February 1, 2018.

The ship from this game is included in R-Type Final, where it is the first in a series of five fighters called the OF series. The Pods are also available on fighters of the OF series.

Reception 
In Japan, Game Machine listed Image Fight on their December 15, 1988 issue as being the most-successful table arcade unit among operators surveyed during that two-week period.

Legacy

According to producer Hiroshi Iuchi, creator of Radiant Silvergun, Image Fight was the main inspiration for Radiant Silvergun'''s design. Tomonobu Itagaki, creator of the Dead or Alive series, listed Image Fight as one of his five favorite games. Image Fight is also said to be the favorite shooter game of Granzella's Kujo Kazuma.

References

External linksImage Fight'' at arcade-history

1988 video games
Arcade video games
Irem games
Nintendo Entertainment System games
Nintendo Switch games
Vertically scrolling shooters
Science fiction video games
PlayStation 4 games
X68000 games
Single-player video games
FM Towns games
TurboGrafx-16 games
TurboGrafx-CD games
Video games developed in Japan
Video games set in the 2040s
Virtual Console games
Virtual Console games for Wii U
Hamster Corporation games